Repipta taurus, the red bull assassin, is a species of assassin bug in the family Reduviidae. It is found in Central America and North America.

References

Further reading

External links

 

Reduviidae
Articles created by Qbugbot
Insects described in 1803